Joseph Daniel Talbott (November 1, 1944 – January 19, 2020) was an American professional football and baseball player. At the University of North Carolina at Chapel Hill, he was a quarterback for two seasons with the North Carolina Tar Heels football team and was named the ACC Player of the Year in 1966. Talbott also led the Tar Heels baseball team to the College World Series in 1966. He also played basketball for North Carolina on their freshmen team, but gave up the sport to concentrate on football and baseball. He was drafted in the 17th round of the 1967 NFL Draft by the San Francisco 49ers, but did not sign a contract with the team and played baseball professionally in the Baltimore Orioles's minor league system instead. His NFL draft rights were traded to the Washington Redskins for a 10th round draft pick on March 5, 1968, but during training camp he was called into active service duty for the United States Army Reserve and missed the entire season. He spent the 1969 season on the Redskins' taxi squad, and was released during final roster cuts before the start of the 1970 season on August 10, 1970.

Talbott was inducted into the North Carolina Sports Hall of Fame in 2003. His No. 10 football jersey hangs in Kenan Stadium along with other honored jerseys.

Talbott led the Rocky Mount Senior High School Blackbirds to winning 4A state championships in baseball, basketball, and football in his senior year in 1963. In 2018, the Danny Talbott Cancer Center at Nash UNC Health Care in Rocky Mount, North Carolina was named after him.

Talbott died at the age of 75 on January 19, 2020, of complications from cancer.

References

1944 births
2020 deaths
Sportspeople from Rocky Mount, North Carolina
Players of American football from North Carolina
American football quarterbacks
North Carolina Tar Heels football players
North Carolina Tar Heels baseball players
United States Army reservists
Washington Redskins players